Tondu Robins A.F.C. is a Welsh football club from the village of Tondu in Bridgend County Borough, South Wales. The club played for 29 seasons in the Welsh Football League including three seasons in the second tier of Welsh club football. Tondu Robins currently play in the Bridgend & District League, Division One. 

Home Colours: Red and Black stripes

Away Colours: White and Black stripes

Tondu Robins home ground Pandy Park is widely regarded as one of the finest pitches in the Bridgend & District League.

History

Welsh Football League history
Information in this section is sourced from the Football Club History Database for Tondu Robins (1966–67 to 1989–90 and 1993–94 to 1995–96 seasons) and AFC Tondu (1990–91 to 1992–93 seasons)

Notes

Honours

Welsh Football League Division Two (Tier 3 of the Welsh Pyramid) – Champions: 1982–83
South Wales Amateur League Division One – Runners-Up: 2003–04
South Wales Amateur League Division Two – Runners-Up: 2002–03
Bridgend & District League Premier Division – Champions: 2001–02 
Bridgend & District League Premier Division – Runners-Up (3): 1998–99; 1999–2000; 2010–11

References

External links
Club Official Twitter
Club Official Facebook

Football clubs in Wales
Welsh Football League clubs
South Wales Amateur League clubs
Bridgend County Borough
Association football clubs established in 1898
1898 establishments in Wales
Bridgend & District League clubs
Football clubs in Bridgend County Borough